Sir Seymour Douglas Tooth (28 January 1904 — 3 July 1982) was a politician in Queensland, Australia. He was a Member of the Queensland Legislative Assembly.

Politics
Tooth was unsuccessful in contesting the 1956 election in the electoral district of Kelvin Grove as the candidate for the Liberal Party. He was defeated by the sitting Labor member, Bert Turner who had held the seat since 1941.

Tooth was elected to the Queensland Legislative Assembly in Kelvin Grove at the 1957 election, defeating Turner. Tooth held Kelvin Grove until 1960, at which that electorate was abolished being largely replaced by the new electoral district of Ashgrove. He successfully contested Ashgrove which he held until the 1974 election which he did not contest. The Liberal party retained Ashgrove in 1974, with the election of their candidate John Greenwood.

He was the Minister for Health from 14 April 1964 to 23 December 1974. He was knighted in 1975.

References

Members of the Queensland Legislative Assembly
1904 births
1982 deaths
Australian Knights Bachelor
Liberal Party of Australia members of the Parliament of Queensland
People from Queensland
Politicians awarded knighthoods
20th-century Australian politicians